The 1999 Asian Men’s Club Volleyball Championship was the first staging of the AVC Club Championships. The tournament was held in Hefei, China. Sichuan Fulan of China won the tournament in round robin format.

Results

|}

|}

Final standing

Awards
MVP:  Zhang Xiang (Sichuan)
Best Spiker:  Shin Jin-sik (Samsung)
Best Blocker:  Zhu Gang (Sichuan)
Best Server:  Zhang Liming (Sichuan)
Best Receiver:  Azim Jazideh (Paykan)
Best Setter:  Yi Van (Sichuan)
Best Digger:  Suk Jin-wook (Samsung)

References
Asian Volleyball Confederation
  Results

A
V
V